The La Foa River is a river of New Caledonia. It has a catchment area of 438 square kilometres. It flows into the Teremba Bay on the southwestern coast.

See also
List of rivers of New Caledonia

References

Rivers of New Caledonia